Trives may refer to:

A Pobra de Trives, municipality in Ourense (province) in the Galicia region of north-west Spain
Samuel Trives (born 1972), Spanish handball player
Sobrado, A Pobra de Trives (San Salvador), a parish in A Pobra de Trives municipality in Ourense in the Galicia region of north-west Spain
Terra de Trives, comarca in the Galician Province of Ourense